The 2010 Finnish League Cup was the 14th season of the Finnish League Cup, Finland's second-most prestigious cup football tournament.

The cup consisted of two stages. First there was group stage that involved 14 Veikkausliiga teams divided into two groups. The top four teams from each group entered the one-legged elimination rounds – quarter-finals, semi-finals and the final.

Group stage
Every team played every other team of its group once, either home or away. The matches were played from 22 January to 27 March 2010.

Group 1

Group 2

Knockout stage

Quarter-finals

Semi-finals

Final

External links
 Finnish League Cup on goalzz.com

Finnish League Cup
League Cup
Finnish League Cup